The T-56 six speed manual transmission has been used in a wide range of vehicles from General Motors, Dodge, and Ford Motor Company. The transmission was originally designed and built by BorgWarner for the Dodge Viper later being used by GM in 1992 for the generation II and later engines, but from 1998 was built by Tremec, though nothing changed internally. The T-56 has been succeeded by the Tremec TR-6060 transmission in many former T-56 applications, as well as applications requiring greater strength than the T-56 could offer.

Applications 
Aston Martin DB7 Vantage, 1999–2003
Aston Martin V12 Vanquish, 2001–2006
Chevrolet Corvette, 1997–2007
Chevrolet Camaro, 1993–2002
Dodge Ram SRT10, 2004–2006
Dodge Viper, 1992–2007
Ford Mustang Cobra, 2003–2004
Ford Mustang Cobra R, 2000
Ford Falcon XR6, XR6T, XR8
FPV F6 Tornado/Typhoon, GT/GT-P 2004–2008
General Motors GM F platform V8 cars, 1993–2002
Holden Commodore 1994–2008
Holden Monaro, 2001–2006
 GM M12
 2001–2004 Chevrolet Corvette Z06
 2004–2006 Pontiac GTO
 2004–2007 Cadillac CTS-V
 GM MN6
 2004–2007 Chevrolet Corvette
 GM M10
 2005–2006 Chevrolet SSR
 2006–2008 Holden VE Commodore
 GM MZ6
 2005–2007 Chevrolet Corvette Z51

Features 
The transmission uses a hydraulic clutch, except for the Cobra which was mechanical.  The Cobra had an 11-inch clutch disc. The entire case, including the bell housing, is made of aluminum. The T-56 has a synchromesh made up of brass synchros for the GM and Ford applications, and stainless steel in the Dodge application.  The transmission also features internal stops which render stopbolts on the shifter mechanism unnecessary.

Identification

See also
GM LT engine
Borg-Warner T-5 transmission
Tremec TR-6060 transmission

External links
Borg Warner Inc.
Official page

56
56
General Motors transmissions